America's Top Colleges is an annual Forbes ranking of colleges and universities in the United States, first published in 2008.

Forbes rated Princeton University the country’s best college in its inaugural (2008) list. United States Military Academy (West Point) took the top honor the following year.  Williams College was ranked first both in 2010 and 2011, and Princeton returned to the top spot in 2012.  In 2013 and 2016, Stanford University occupied the No. 1 spot, with elite liberal arts schools Williams and Pomona College topping the rankings in the intervening years. The magazine ranked Harvard University as America's best college from 2017 until 2021, when the University of California, Berkeley topped the list, becoming the first public school to ever do so.

Methodology 

 "Alumni Salary": 20%
 "Debt": 15%
 "Return On investment": 15%
 "Graduation Rate": 15%
 "Forbes American Leaders List": 15%
 "Retention Rate": 10%
 "Academic Success": 10%

Misreporting 
Starting in 2013, four schools that had admitted to misreporting admissions data were removed from the list for two years. The four removed colleges were Bucknell University, Claremont McKenna College, Emory University, and Iona College.

References

University and college rankings in the United States
Forbes lists
2008 introductions
Lists of universities and colleges in the United States